Enrico Sappia (1833-1906) was a journalist and author.

Early life
Henri Sappia was born on April 17, 1833 in Touët-de-l'Escarène, County of Nice, Kingdom of Sardinia, (nowadays Alpes-Maritimes, France).

Sappia was sentenced to a 15-year prison sentence on August 12, 1870 due to his opposition to Emperor Napoleon III and his support for the republic. With the fall of the Second French Empire on September 4, 1870, he never went to jail.

Career
Sappia was a journalist. He founded Nice-historique in 1898.

Sappia co-founded the Acadèmia Nissarda, a historical society in Nice, in 1904 with Alexandre Baréty. He stressed that Nice was culturally Provençal, not Italian.

Death and legacy
Sappia died on September 29, 1909 in Nice, France. The Boulevard Henri Sappia in Nice was named after him.

Further reading

References

1833 births
1906 deaths
People from Nice
French journalists